Sir Richard Couch (17 May 1817 – 28 November 1905) was an Anglo-Indian judge who served on the colonial courts of India and also on the Judicial Committee of the Privy Council, at that time the court of last resort for the British Empire.

Couch was appointed Chief Justice of the High Court of Bombay in 1866.  He served for four years in that position, before being appointed Chief Justice of the High Court of Calcutta, serving in that post from 1870 to 1875.

Upon his retirement from the High Court of Calcutta, Couch was appointed to the Judicial Committee of the Privy Council in 1881.  He sat on numerous appeals from India and Canada.

References 

1817 births
1905 deaths
19th-century English judges
Members of the Judicial Committee of the Privy Council
Chief Justices of the Bombay High Court
Chief Justices of the Calcutta High Court
British India judges
Members of the Privy Council of the United Kingdom
Knights Bachelor